"Hurt Lovers" is a song by English boy band Blue. It was written by Alexander Zuckowski, Martin "Fly" Fliegenschmidt, Jez Ashurst, and David Jost and recorded for the group's fourth studio album, Roulette (2013). Production was helmed by Grubert and Zuckowski, with Fliegenschmidt and Kiko Masbaum credited as co-producers. 

The song was released in Austria, Germany and Switzerland as the album's lead single on 4 January 2013, three weeks prior to the release of the Roulette. It was Blue's first official single in two years, following the release of their Eurovision 2011 entry, "I Can", in May 2011. "Hurt Lovers" became Blue's sixth top 10 hit in Germany, where it peaked at number seven and served as the official theme for the German film Break Up Man (2013). In the United Kingdom, the sond was released on 22 April 2013. It charted at number 70 on the UK Singles Chart, becoming their lowest-charting single by then in the UK.

Background
Blue began recording new material in July 2010, three months after they first got back together, after a five-year break from the music industry. In an interview, the band claimed that "Hurt Lovers" was one of the first tracks they recorded after reuniting, and that it was an obvious choice for the band's reunion single. The track was written by Alexander Zuckowski, Martin "Fly" Fliegenschmidt, Jez Ashurst, and David Jost.

Blue first premiered "Hurt Lovers" during a concert in China on 22 June 2012. It received positive reception across Asia, before being officially premiered in Germany on 6 October 2012. Thus, the creators of the film  approached the band, and asked if the song could be used as the official theme for the film. Thus, the track received an early release in Germany on 4 January 2013, before being released across the world later in the year. In promotion of the single, Blue performed it live on The Voice of Romania in December 2012, as well as embarking on an acoustic radio tour across six cities in Germany. They also performed it on The Late Late Show in Ireland on 26 April 2013.

Music video

Two versions of the music video have been filmed. The first was directed by German filmmaker Katja Kuhl and filmed towards the end of October 2012. Set in black and white, filming took place in the German municipality  of Prerow on the Darß peninsula on the southern shore of the Baltic Sea. The visuals show the band performing the track on the edge of a grassy cliff, with Lee Ryan and Duncan James in puffy fur coats, and Antony Costa and Simon Webbe wearing shirts and ties. Actors Tim Forssman and Nell Pietrzyk appear as extras in the clip. This version of the video was released on 15 March 2013, as the video to accompany the release of the single on the British market.

A second version of the video, called Schlussmacher version, was filmed in Berlin towards the end of November 2012 and released to Blue's official YouTube account on 13 December 2012, at a total length of three-minutes and fifty-six seconds. The video it set in a giant shopping centre, where Blue have a chance meeting with Matthias Schweighöfer and Milan Peschel, the stars of the film Schlussmacher (2012). The video also features a number of clips from the film, intertwined with the footage of Blue. This version of the video was filmed exclusively for the German market.

Track listing

Notes
  signifies a co-producer

Credits and personnel
Credits adapted from the liner notes of Roulette.

Jez Ashurst – songwriter
Sascha Bühren – mastering
Martin "Fly" Fliegenschmidt – songwriter, co-producer, guitar
Robin Grubert – producer, keyboards, programmed by
David Jost – songwriter

Kiko Masbaum – co-producer, drums, keyboards, mixer
Boris Matchin – strings
Stefan Pintev – strings
Rodrigo Reichel – strings
Alexander Zuckowski – songwriter, producer, drum programming, guitar, piano

Charts

Release history

References

2013 singles
2013 songs
Blue (English band) songs
Songs written by Jez Ashurst
Songs written by David Jost
Island Records singles
Songs written by Martin Fliegenschmidt